Erlandia mexicana is a species of beetle in the family Cerambycidae. It was described by Noguera and Chemsak in 2001.

References

Cerambycinae
Beetles described in 2001